Cepora eurygonia is a butterfly in the family Pieridae. It is found on north-eastern Sulawesi.

References

Pierini
Butterflies described in 1874
Butterflies of Indonesia
Taxa named by Carl Heinrich Hopffer